Snot is an American hardcore punk band from Santa Barbara, California. Formed in 1995, the band released their only studio album Get Some with founding vocalist Lynn Strait in 1997 and disbanded after his death in 1998. In 2008, the lineup of lead guitarist Mikey Doling, bassist John Fahnestock, drummer Jamie Miller and rhythm guitarist Sonny Mayo reunited. In 2009, a new band, Tons, was formed, with Brandon Espinosa as vocalist. As of February 2014, Snot has reformed again.

History

Formation, Get Some and death of Lynn Strait (1995–1998) 
The band was formed by singer Lynn Strait, the former bassist of a local punk band, Lethal Dose, and lead guitarist Mikey Doling, formerly of Kronix. After building a strong following with performances in Los Angeles, Snot signed with Geffen Records, and began work on their debut album with producer  T-Ray. The album, titled Get Some was released on May 27, 1997.

The band performed on the 1998 Ozzfest tour. On July 9, 1998, Strait was arrested in Mansfield, Massachusetts, after emerging nude from the oversized toilet prop used by Limp Bizkit in their performances. The band began work on their second album. On December 11, 1998, Strait died in a car accident when a truck struck his car, killing him and his boxer, Dobbs. The band disbanded following Strait's death, with Doling stating, "We can't go on without Lynn. It's just bullshit when bands do that."

Post Accident (1999–2007)
Because Strait had not recorded vocals for the album, it was decided that the album's vocal tracks would be completed by friends of Strait as a tribute. Strait Up, released on November 7, 2000, featured appearances by the lead vocalists of System of a Down, Korn, Hed PE, Soulfly, Incubus, Sevendust, Limp Bizkit, Coal Chamber, Slipknot and Sugar Ray, among others. It peaked at number 56 on the Billboard 200.

A live album, Alive!, was released on July 30, 2002. It peaked at number 12 on the Billboard Heatseekers chart. On April 5, 2007, the band reunited for a performance in Anaheim, California, with vocals performed by Invitro singer Jeff Weber.

First reunion, Tons and breakup (2008–2013)
In 2008, the band reformed, with former Divine Heresy singer Tommy Vext on vocals. Tommy Cummings and Sonny Mayo left the band, and a new band, "Tons", was formed in 2009 with a new vocalist, Brandon Espinoza, formerly of Spineshank and minus knives. They recorded three new songs titled "Ability & Control", "1000 Ways of Pain" and "Fan the Flames" before members of the group moved on to new projects.

Second reunion (2014–present)
On February 11, 2014, Snot reunited again at the Whisky a Go Go in West Hollywood. This second reunion lineup once again features Vext, Mayo, Doling, Fahnestock and Miller. They went on to play three more shows in the Southern California area before once again going quiet, although they poked at the possibility of another future U.S. tour. In August it was announced that Snot would be hitting the road once again, starting November 28 and going through December 22 all throughout the U.S. An international tour is coming in January/February. However, in October, vocalist Tommy Vext announced he had left the band to form his new band, Westfield Massacre, and that Snot already had a replacement vocalist (Carl Bensley) in place. For the European dates, Mike Smith would fill in for Sonny Mayo, who was going to be unable to tour due to business commitments. Mayo's last performance with Snot was January 20, 2015, as the surprise act before Wayne Static's former bandmates at the Wayne Static Memorial Show at the Whisky a Go Go.

Style
Snot's music style contains elements of punk rock, heavy metal and funk. They have been described as hardcore punk, nu metal and funk metal.

Members
Current lineup
 Mikey Doling – lead guitar (1995–1998, 2008–2011, 2012, 2014–present)
 John Fahnestock – bass (1995–1998, 2008–2011, 2012, 2014–present)
 Jamie Miller - drums (1996-1998, 2008-2011, 2012, 2014-present)
 Sonny Mayo – rhythm guitar (1995–1998, 2008–2009, 2014–present)
 Carl Bensley - vocals (2014–present)

Former members
 Lynn Strait – vocals (1995–1998; died 1998)
 Tommy Vext – vocals (2008–2009, 2014)
 James "Fed" Carrol – drums (1995–1996)
 Mike Smith – rhythm guitar (1998, 2015)

Timeline

Discography 
Get Some (1997)
Strait Up (2000)
Alive! (live album, 2002)

References

External links 
Snot on Myspace
Tons on Myspace

American funk metal musical groups
Hardcore punk groups from California
Nu metal musical groups from California
Musical groups established in 1995
Musical groups disestablished in 1998
Musical groups reestablished in 2008
Musical groups disestablished in 2011
Musical groups reestablished in 2014
Musical quintets